Ganar Cádiz en Común (Spanish for Winning Cádiz in Common) is an electoral alliance formed by United Left/The Greens–Assembly for Andalusia, Equo and Citizens for Cádiz to contest the 2015 Cádiz municipal election.

Member parties
United Left/The Greens–Assembly for Andalusia (IULV–CA)
Equo (eQuo)
Citizens for Cádiz (CPCAD)

Electoral performance

City Council of Cádiz

References

Political parties in Andalusia
Political parties established in 2015
Political party alliances in Spain